Curtis La Mar Goodwin (born September 30, 1972) is an American former professional baseball outfielder. He played in Major League Baseball (MLB) for the Baltimore Orioles, Cincinnati Reds, Colorado Rockies, Chicago Cubs, and Toronto Blue Jays.

He attended San Leandro High School in San Leandro, California.

References

External links

The Baseball Gauge
Venezuela Winter League

1972 births
Living people
African-American baseball players
American expatriate baseball players in Canada
Atlantic City Surf players
Baltimore Orioles players
Berkshire Black Bears players
Bowie Baysox players
Chicago Cubs players
Cincinnati Reds players
Colorado Rockies players
Frederick Keys players
Gulf Coast Orioles players
Indianapolis Indians players
Kane County Cougars players
Leones del Caracas players
American expatriate baseball players in Venezuela
Major League Baseball outfielders
Newark Bears players
Oklahoma RedHawks players
Pennsylvania Road Warriors players
Rochester Red Wings players
Solano Steelheads players
Sonoma County Crushers players
South Georgia Peanuts players
Baseball players from Oakland, California
Toronto Blue Jays players
Wichita Wranglers players
American expatriate baseball players in Australia
Perth Heat players
21st-century African-American sportspeople
20th-century African-American sportspeople